Opseth is a Norwegian surname. Notable people with the surname include:

Kjell Opseth (1936–2017), Norwegian politician
Kristian Opseth (born 1990), Norwegian footballer
Silje Opseth (born 1999), Norwegian ski jumper

Norwegian-language surnames